Paul Dan A. Cristea (13 February 1941, Bucharest – 17 April 2013) was a Romanian professor of engineering. He was named an IEEE EMBS Fellow in 2012 "for contributions to modernizing and internationalizing engineering education".

Education and career
Cristea got his master's degrees from the Department of Electronics and Telecommunications of the Politehnica University of Bucharest and from the Department of Physics at the University of Bucharest in 1962. In 1970, he got his Ph.D. from the Polytechnic Institute of Bucharest, and, after graduation, remained at the university. Between 1962 and 1990, Cristea served as assistant, associate, professor, and full professor at his alma mater and was a founder of the Digital Signal Processing Laboratory at the Politehnica University of Bucharest. Since 2005, Cristea was an associate editor and member of the editorial board of the EURASIP Journal on Bioinformatics and System Biology.

In 2011 he became a full member of the Romanian Academy.

References

1941 births
2013 deaths
Engineers from Bucharest
University of Bucharest alumni
Politehnica University of Bucharest alumni
Academic staff of the Politehnica University of Bucharest
Fellow Members of the IEEE
Fellows of SPIE
Members of the Romanian Academy of Sciences